Carlos Gustavo De Luca (born 13 February 1962) is an Argentine former footballer who played for various clubs in Argentina, Chile, Peru and Switzerland. Of those countries, he highlighted in Chile being goalscorer in its first division, second division and its national cup.

He fought at the Falklands War (1982).

Early life
De Luca began playing rugby, sport which he practiced until he was seventeen.

Honours

Club
Colo-Colo
 Recopa Sudamericana (1): 1992

Individual
 Segunda División de Chile Top-Scorer (1): 1987
 Primera División de Chile Top-Scorer (1): 1988
 Copa Chile Top-Scorer (1): 1991

Notes

References

External links
 

1962 births
Living people
Argentine footballers
Argentine expatriate footballers
Chilean Primera División players
All Boys footballers
Club Atlético River Plate footballers
Talleres de Remedios de Escalada footballers
Club Atlético Douglas Haig players
Club Alianza Lima footballers
Club Universitario de Deportes footballers
Cobreloa footballers
Colo-Colo footballers
Regional Atacama footballers
Deportes La Serena footballers
Everton de Viña del Mar footballers
O'Higgins F.C. footballers
Deportes Temuco footballers
Santiago Wanderers footballers
Expatriate footballers in Chile
Expatriate footballers in Peru
Expatriate footballers in Switzerland
Association football forwards
Footballers from Buenos Aires